The iPod Touch (stylized as iPod touch) is a discontinued line of iOS-based mobile devices designed and marketed by Apple Inc. with a touchscreen-controlled user interface. As with other iPod models, the iPod Touch can be used as a portable media player and a handheld gaming device, but can also be used as a digital camera, a web browser and for messaging. It is similar in design to the iPhone, and can run most iPhone third-party apps from the App Store, but it connects to the Internet only through Wi-Fi and does not use cellular network data, so it is not a smartphone. 

The iPod Touch was introduced in 2007; some 100 million iPod Touch units were sold by May 2013. The final generation of iPod Touch, released on May 28, 2019, is the seventh-generation model.

iPod Touch models were sold by storage space and color; all models of the same generation typically offered identical features, performance, and operating system upgrades. An exception was the fifth generation, in which the low-end (16 GB) model was initially sold without a rear-facing camera and in a single color. 

The iPod Touch was the last product in Apple's iPod product line after the discontinuation of the iPod Nano and iPod Shuffle on July 27, 2017, after which Apple revised the storage and pricing for the iPod Touch with 32 and 128 GB of storage. On May 10, 2022, Apple discontinued the iPod Touch, effectively ending the iPod product line as a whole.  Apple dropped support for the seventh-generation iPod Touch following the release of iOS 16, ending software support for the iPod Touch lineup and the iPod product line as a whole.

Features

Software 

The iPod Touch ran on iOS, the same operating system as the iPhone. It included Safari, Google Maps, a Mail app, apps for Music and Videos, and several more. Users type on a virtual keyboard displayed on the screen. Apple operates online stores, allowing users to buy and directly download music, videos and third-party software. From launch, the iPod Touch was described by journalists as an "iPhone without the phone", and each iPod Touch model to date has been introduced with the same release of iOS as the contemporary iPhone model.

In June 2011, iOS 5, the fifth major release of iOS software, was announced at Apple's WWDC 2011, which added notification, messaging and reminder features. Apple limited some features, most notably the voice control system Siri, to the iPhone. iOS 6, which was released on September 19, 2012 for the fourth and fifth generation iPod Touch models, contains 200 new features including Passbook, Facebook integration and Apple Maps. The fifth generation iPod Touch gained the ability to take panoramic photos, a feature shared with the iPhone 4S and iPhone 5.

On June 8, 2015, it was announced at the WWDC that the iPod Touch fifth generation would support iOS 9, along with other A5 Chip devices. This makes the iPod Touch fifth generation the first iPod Touch to support four major versions of iOS.

Early iOS updates prior to iOS 4 have been paid for owners of supported iPod Touch models. Apple received criticism for this decision and for excluding certain features from the iPod Touch software that the iPhone included. Apple's position was that they could add features for free to the iPhone because the revenue from it is accounted for on a subscription basis under accounting rules, rather than as a one time payment (as iPhones were often sold with a carrier contract). At WWDC in June 2010, as of iOS 4, Steve Jobs announced that Apple had "found a way" to make subsequent OS upgrades available free to iPod Touch owners.

Setup and synchronization
iPod Touch units running iOS 4 or earlier require a Mac or PC to be set up for the first time. Downloading apps or media from the iTunes Store and App Store does not require a computer, though media not purchased through the iTunes Store still has to be added through a computer.

New iPods bought after October 12, 2011 have iOS 5.0 or later preloaded, and can be set up wirelessly, without the need of a PC or Mac.

Purchasing content
To purchase content on the iPod Touch, the user must create an Apple ID or have an existing account. With this account one may download music and videos from the iTunes Store, apps from the App Store, or books from the Apple Books Store. An Apple ID account created without a credit card can be used to get free content, and gift cards can be used to pay for apps instead of using a credit card.

Third-party applications
The only official way to obtain third-party applications for the iPod Touch is through Apple's App Store, which is a branch of iTunes Store. The App Store application, available in all versions of iOS from 2.0 onwards, allows users to browse and download applications from a single online repository (hosted by Apple) with the iTunes Store. 

Sideloading apps outside the App Store is done through the Xcode application, and is intended for developers and enterprises, though tools for sideloading outside of Xcode exist, and are mainly used for applications not allowed in the App Store.

Design and hardware 
The iPod Touch is generally similar to the iPhone models prior to the iPhone X (excluding the second and third generation iPhone SE). Compared to a same-generation iPhone, an iPod Touch is thinner, lighter and less expensive, while lacking some hardware and software features. Steve Jobs once referred to the iPod Touch as "training wheels for the iPhone".

All iPod Touch models lack biometric authentication, 3D Touch, NFC, GPS, an earpiece speaker and a noise-cancelling microphone. Depending on the generation, the iPod Touch may have a smaller or otherwise inferior display and camera(s). Newer models (5th, 6th, and 7th generation) lack the ambient light sensor that makes automatic brightness available. The first generation iPod Touch lacks a built-in speaker, and the first, second, and third generation iPod Touch lack a microphone, a camera, and a flash. Starting with the 4th generation iPod Touch, a camera and microphone were added, and starting with the 5th generation iPod Touch, an LED flash was added.

The iPod Touch has no cellular modem, and therefore cannot directly make phone calls on the public switched telephone network. However, it can make VoIP calls such as FaceTime, and send iMessages to other iPhones, Macs, iPads, and iPod Touch models with an Apple ID. The 5th generation iPod Touch and later can forward and receive standard phone calls through a separate iPhone (a feature introduced in iOS 8), with the Wi-Fi Calling feature. The two devices must be linked to the same Apple ID, and the iPhone's carrier must support this feature.

Connectivity 

The iPod Touch can communicate with a computer through Wi-Fi or USB using a cable and a dock connector.

iPod models released before 2012 feature a 30-pin dock connector (known colloquially as the iPod dock connector), which carried analog signals.

The fifth, sixth, and seventh generations of the iPod Touch feature a new digital dock connector, called Lightning, which was introduced alongside the iPhone 5, fourth generation iPad and first generation iPad Mini, and the seventh generation iPod Nano models. This new connector is smaller than the previous one allowing for a slimmer form factor, and is reversible. Various accessories are available to connect the Apple Lightning connector to the older 30-pin dock connector or USB, although not all old accessories will work, because the Lightning connector cannot handle analog signals.

User-made modifications

Like all of Apple's iOS devices, the iPod Touch is a tightly controlled or closed platform. Communication between apps is limited and controlled, and Apple is the only authorized software vendor for firmware and applications. Hackers have attempted to "jailbreak" all iOS devices to enable forbidden or unsupported features, such as multitasking in iOS versions before 4.0, themes for the home screen, and enabling the battery-percentage indicator (limited to the iPhone prior to the seventh generation iPod Touch). Jailbreaks for the iPod Touch first surfaced a month after the original model was released in September 2007, when hackers released JailbreakMe 1.0 (also called "AppSnapp") to jailbreak iPhone OS 1.1.1. This allowed users to install third-party programs on their devices before Apple permitted this with iPhone OS 2.

Apple's warranty statement implies that an iPod Touch after jailbreaking or other modification made by unofficial means is not covered by Apple's warranty. Jailbreaking is a violation of the terms and conditions for using iOS. While the jailbreaking process can normally be undone by performing a restore through iTunes, there is a risk of rendering the device unusable.

Models

, there have been seven models of iPod Touch devices produced.

 1st generation (2007–2008)
 2nd generation (2008–2010)
 3rd generation (2009–2010)
 4th generation (2010–2013)
 5th generation (2012–2015)
6th generation (2015–2019)
 7th generation (2019–2022)

Reception
Upon launch in 2007 the first generation iPod Touch received mostly good reviews for its display, its full Web browser, and YouTube support. However it was also criticized for being a "stripped down" iPhone, for lacking external volume buttons, and for having a lower-quality display.

Notable competing products as of 2009 included Creative's ZEN X-Fi2, Sony's Walkman X Series, and Microsoft's Zune HD; and as of 2011, the Samsung Galaxy Player and Sony Walkman Z Series.

Later models received a more lukewarm reception, with reviewers questioning whether an iPod Touch made sense as a product in a time where smartphones had become more affordable.

Discontinuation
In May 2022, Apple announced that after over 20 years, the iPod Touch, and the iPod line as a whole, were to be discontinued; the iPod Touch would remain available only while supplies last.

Supported iOS versions

See also

 Comparison of iPod file managers
 Comparison of portable media players
 List of iOS devices

Notes

References

External links
 
  – official site
 Technical Specifications (all models) on Apple Inc.

Touch
IOS
Touchscreen portable media players
ITunes
Computer-related introductions in 2007
Products introduced in 2007
Digital audio players
Products and services discontinued in 2022
Discontinued Apple Inc. products